Josiane Catarina "Jassie" Vasconcelos Costa (born 20 June 1994) is a Portuguese professional footballer who plays as a defender for the Portugal women's national team.

Club career
Vasconcelos played futsal as a child, before switching to handball as a 12-year-old. When her parents separated she moved to Wales in 2015 to live with her mother. She then joined Welsh Premier Women's Football League PILCS and moved on to UEFA Women's Champions League contestant Cardiff Met. Ladies in 2016. For the 2017–18 season she moved on to Cardiff City, who played in the English league system.

In February 2018 S.L. Benfica announced Vasconcelos' signing to their team for their debut season in the 2018–19 Campeonato Nacional de Promoção. Vasconcelos spoke of her pride and described Benfica's kit as a "sacred mantle".

Vasconcelos announced a transfer to French Division 1 Féminine club FC Metz in June 2019, by which time she had scored 36 goals in 19 games for Benfica, across all competitions.

International career
Vasconcelos was named by coach Francisco Neto in the Portugal national team for the first time in September 2017, for two friendlies against Finland.

Honours
Benfica
Campeonato Nacional Feminino: 2020–21
 Campeonato Nacional II Divisão Feminino: 2018–19
 Taça de Portugal: 2018–19

References

External links
 
 
 
 Club profile at FC Metz 

1994 births
Living people
Footballers from Porto
Portuguese women's footballers
Portugal women's international footballers
Women's association football defenders
Portuguese expatriate footballers
Expatriate women's footballers in Wales
FA Women's National League players
Cardiff City Ladies F.C. players
Portuguese expatriate sportspeople in Wales
S.L. Benfica (women) footballers
Welsh Premier Women's Football League players
Cardiff Met. Ladies F.C. players
Portuguese expatriate sportspeople in France
Expatriate women's footballers in France
FC Metz (women) players
Division 1 Féminine players